Bowen is a ghost town in Washington County, Nebraska, United States.

History
Bowen was platted in 1886. It was named for John S. Bowen, a pioneer settler.

References

Geography of Washington County, Nebraska